James Graham Hamilton McOwat (born 27 November 1944) is a British stage and television actor who was the 15th President of Equity, the actors' trade union, between 2008 and 2010. Formerly vice-president for ten years, Hamilton has been involved in Equity's ruling Council since 1976, during his acting career in plays and musicals in the West End. He is known chiefly for his portrayal of Fagin in Oliver! After working in the West End, he became famous for playing the villain in over twenty-one pantomimes, appearing at major theatres throughout the UK. He was the architect of Equity's Annual Conference and its Rules that replaced the union's inadequate Annual General Meeting in 1995. In 2007, he was awarded Honorary Life Membership of Equity by its governing Council for distinguished service to the union.

References

External links
https://m.imdb.com/name/nm0357886

1944 births
Living people
English male stage actors
English male television actors
Male actors from Leeds
Alumni of Rose Bruford College
People educated at Giggleswick School